Jack of All Trades is a 1936 British comedy film directed by Robert Stevenson and Jack Hulbert and starring Hulbert, Gina Malo and Robertson Hare. It is based on the 1934 play Youth at the Helm. The film was made at Islington Studios, with sets designed by Alex Vetchinsky.

Plot
Jack, out of work and responsible for an aged mother, takes a succession of jobs, bluffing his way through them all.

Cast
Jack Hulbert as Jack Warrender
Gina Malo as Frances Wilson
Robertson Hare as Lionel Fitch
Mary Jerrold as Mrs. Warrender
Cecil Parker as Sir. Chas Darrington
Athole Stewart as Bank Chairman
Felix Aylmer as Managing Director
Ian McLean as The Fire Raiser
H. F. Maltby as Bank Director
Fewlass Llewellyn as Bank Director
 Marcus Barron  as Williams  
 C. M. Hallard as Henry Kilner  
 Peggy Simpson as Typist  
 Betty Astell as Dancer 
 Arnold Bell 
 Harry Crocker 
 Henry B. Longhurst as Party Guest 
 Frederick Piper as Jimmy, Employment Clerk
 Victor Rietti as Head Waiter  
 Bruce Seton as Dancer  
 Cyril Smith 
 Netta Westcott

Critical reception
Writing for The Spectator in 1936, Graham Greene gave the film a mildly negative review. After giving high praise to the board meeting scene in the first half of the film, and describing it as an "excellent sequence" of "pointed fooling", Greene comments that the remainder of the film "degenerates into nothing but [...] an awful eternal disembodied Cheeriness".

References

Bibliography
 Low, Rachael. Filmmaking in 1930s Britain. George Allen & Unwin, 1985.
 Wood, Linda. British Films, 1927-1939. British Film Institute, 1986.

External links

1936 films
1936 comedy films
1930s English-language films
British black-and-white films
Films directed by Robert Stevenson
Films directed by Jack Hulbert
British comedy films
British films based on plays
Films set in London
Gainsborough Pictures films
Islington Studios films
1930s British films